Ebira (pronounced as /eh 'be ra/; also known as Igbira, Egbura, or Okene) is a Niger-Congo language. It is spoken by around 2 million people in North central Nigeria. It is the most divergent Nupoid language.

Geographic distribution
The majority of speakers are in Kogi State in the Central part of that state; Nasarawa State in Toto Local Government Area, where the name is usually spelled Egbura; Edo State in the Town of Igarra, where the language is usually known as Etuno; and in the Federal Capital Territory in the Town of Abaji. It is also spoken in Lapai (Niger State), Makurdi (Benue State and Kwara State and some are also found in Ondo State (Akoko).

Dialects
Varieties of Ebira are:
Tao dialect, the more prominent dialect used in media and publishing. It is spoken to the west of the Niger-Benue confluence
Koto (Okpoto) dialect, spoken to the northeast of the Niger-Benue confluence. It is known only from a wordlist in Sterk (1978a).

Blench (2019) lists Okene, Etuno (Tụnọ), and Koto.

References
  

Nupoid languages